The 2001-02 Division 1 season was the 37th of the competition of the first-tier football in Senegal.  The tournament was organized by the Senegalese Football Federation.  The season began on 20 October 2001 and finished on 6 May 2002.  ASC Jeanne d'Arc won the ninth title and participated in the 2002 CAF Champions League the following year.  AS Douanes participated in the 2002 CAF Cup of Cups and SONACOS in the 2002 CAF Winners' Cup.

ASC Jeanne d'Arc was ten points ahead of SONACOS and thirteen ahead of ASEC Ndiambour.  ASC Jeanne d'Arc became the second and recent to have the total of nine, the total national championship wins were shared with Diaraf until Jeanne d'Arc won their tenth in the following season.

The season would again feature fourteen clubs.

ASC Jeanne d'Arc was the defending team of the title.  The season featured 182 matches and scored 263 goals, more than last season.

Participating clubs

 US Gorée
 Compagnie sucrière sénégalaise (Senegalese Sugar Company)
 ASC Port Autonome
 AS Douanes
 ASC Jeanne d'Arc
 ASFA Dakar
 AS Police

 ETICS Mboro
 ASC Niayès-Pikine
 ASC Diaraf
 US Rail
 Dakar Université Club
 SONACOS
 ASEC Ndiambour

Overview
The league was contested by 14 teams with ASC Jeanne d'Arc again winning the championship.

League standings

Footnotes

External links
Historic results at rsssf.com

Senegal
Senegal Premier League seasons